Md. Saifur Rahman is a Well-known Bangladeshi politician for the Jatiya Party (Ershad), a former Member of Parliament and District Council Chairman
 in the Dhaka-3 constituency.

Career
Rahman was elected to parliament from Dhaka-3 as a Jatiya Party candidate in 1988.

References

Jatiya Party politicians
Living people
4th Jatiya Sangsad members
1951 births